Sala v Freistaat Bayern (1998) C-85/96 is an EU law case, concerning the free movement of citizens in the European Union.

Facts 
Maria Martinez Sala, a Spanish national, lived in Germany since 1968, age 12. She had various residence permits. They expired. She had applied for an extension. She had a baby in 1993 and applied for child allowance. She was turned down because she did not have German nationality, a residence entitlement, or a residence permit. If she had been working she would have got a benefit under Regulation 492/11 art 7(2).

Judgment
The Court of Justice held that Ms Sala should have got the allowance, because it was discriminatory to require an EU citizen produce a residence permit which the national did not need to provide.

See also

European Union law

Notes

References

Court of Justice of the European Union case law
Freedom of movement